Yin Bat Htae Ka Dar is a 2017 Burmese drama film starring Pyay Ti Oo, Eaindra Kyaw Zin and Htun Eaindra Bo. The film produced by Khayay Phyu Film Production premiered in Myanmar on October 27, 2017.

Cast

Award and nominations

References

2017 films
2010s Burmese-language films
Burmese drama films
Films shot in Myanmar
Films directed by Wyne
2017 drama films